The Deutscher Dirigentenpreis (DDP) is an international competition for concert and opera conducting and serves to promote young conductors of all nations who are younger than 32 years of age.

History of the prize 
The German Conductors' Prize is awarded by the Deutscher Musikrat (in Bonn), which was launched in cooperation with the Kölner Philharmonie, the Cologne Opera, the Gürzenich Orchestra Cologne and the WDR Symphony Orchestra. As a cultural partner, the competition will be accompanied by the West German Radio's WDR 3 culture wave. It will be awarded internationally for the first time in 2017 and is held every two years. A unique selling point is the inclusion of the genres of opera and concert in the repertoire. The competition will be open to the public from the second round onwards.

Prize money 
The prize is endowed with a total of 34,000 euros, making it one of the highest endowed conducting competitions in Europe.
 1st prize: 15,000 euros
 2nd prize: 10,000 euros (donated by the Ernsting Foundation Alter Hof Herding)
 3rd prize: 5,000 euros (donated by the International Kurt Masur Institute)
 Audience Award: 2,500 euros (donated by the Oscar and Vera Ritter Foundation)
 Prize of the Opera Friends Bonn: 1,000 euros
 Bärenreiter Prize for the best interpretation of a work from the 20th/21st century: 500 euros (donated by the Bärenreiter-Verlag)

The winners receive concert engagements and assistances at opera houses and German partner orchestras (Beethoven Orchester Bonn, Gürzenich Orchestra Cologne, Hof Symphony Orchestra, Munich Symphony Orchestra, Nuremberg Symphony Orchestra, Cologne Opera House, Staatsphilharmonie Rheinland-Pfalz and the WDR Symphony Orchestra).

Jury 
 Peter Gülke, honorary chairman, conductor and musicologist
 Lothar Zagrosek, chairman and conductor
 Lioba Braun, Mezzo-soprano
 Siegwald Bütow, Manager and Producer of the WDR Symphony Orchestra
 Louwrens Langevoort, Director of the Cologne Philharmonic Orchestra
 Birgit Meyer, Director of the Cologne Opera
 Stephan Mösch, music and theatre scholar, publicist

Prize winners

Prizewinners of the German Conductors' Forum (1995–2015) 
 1995: Marc Piollet
 1999: Gabriel Feltz
 2001: Christian Voß
 2002: Matthias Foremny
 2004: Markus Poschner
 2006: Mihkel Kütson
 2009: Simon Gaudenz
 2011: Francesco Angelico
 2013: Kristiina Poska
 2015: Leo McFall

Winners of the German Conductors' Prize (from 2017) 
 2017: Hossein Pishkar (1st prize winner)
 Dominic Beikirch (2nd prize winner)
 Anna Rakitina (3rd prize winner)
 Vladimir Yaskorski (special prize winner)
 2019:  (1st prize winner)
 Gábor Hontvári (2nd prize winner)
 Chloé van Soeterstède (3rd prize winner)

References

External links 
 

Conducting competitions